Eleanor Mayo (1920–1981) was an American novelist of the mid twentieth century.  She lived most of her life on Mount Desert Island, Maine.  She was raised in Southwest Harbor, Maine. She was the life companion of the well known Maine novelist Ruth Moore. Mayo was introduced to Moore in the summer of 1940 by the latter's sister who had been Mayo's high school teacher. Mayo accompanied Moore on her return to California. The two soon moved to New York City where they remained until returning permanently to Maine in 1947. Mayo published five novels during her life. Mayos's novel Turn Home was made into the 1950 film Tarnished.

Mayo was active in local politics holding several elected positions in Tremont, Maine.  She was the first female selectman elected in Tremont, and later served many years as the town's tax assessor. Ruth Moore wrote of the stir caused by Mayo's election: "A great flurry it got in all the papers and on the radio, and all the old diehards and shellbacks in town, who think 'wimmen's fit fa one thing and that's all, by God,' are standing on their heads and spinning."

The house built in 1947 by Mayo and Moore was listed on the National Register of Historic Places in 2004, recognizing their literary accomplishments.

Bibliography 
 Turn Home (1945)
 Loom of the Land (1946)
 October Fire (1951)
 Swan's Harbor (1953)
 Forever Stranger (1958)
 When Foley Craddock Tore Off my Grandfather's Thumb: The Collected Stories of Ruth Moore and Eleanor Mayo (2004)

References

External links
 Photograph by Eleanor Mayo

1920 births
1981 deaths
Writers from Maine
People from Mount Desert Island
Maine local politicians
20th-century American women writers
20th-century American politicians
People from Tremont, Maine